A firewall is a fire-resistant barrier used to prevent the spread of fire. Firewalls are built between or through buildings, structures, or electrical substation transformers, or within an aircraft or vehicle.

Applications
Firewalls can be used to subdivide a building into separate fire areas and are constructed in accordance with the locally applicable building codes. Firewalls are a portion of a building's passive fire protection systems.

Firewalls can be used to separate-high value transformers at an electrical substation in the event of a mineral oil tank rupture and ignition. The firewall serves as a fire containment wall between one oil-filled transformer and other neighboring transformers, building structures, and site equipment.

Types

There are three main classifications of fire rated walls: fire walls, fire barriers, and fire partitions. 
A firewall is an assembly of materials used to separate transformers, structures, or large buildings to prevent the spread of fire by constructing a wall which extends from the foundation through the roof with a prescribed fire resistance duration and independent structural stability. This allows a building to be subdivided into smaller sections. If a section becomes structurally unstable due to fire or other causes, that section can break or fall away from the other sections in the building. 
A fire barrier wall, or a fire partition, is a fire-rated wall assembly that provides lower levels of protection than typically provided by a fire wall. The main differences are that these fire resistant walls are not structurally self-sufficient. 

Fire barrier walls are typically continuous from an exterior wall to an exterior wall, or from a floor below to a floor or roof above, or from one fire barrier wall to another fire barrier wall, having a fire resistance rating equal to or greater than the required rating for the application. Fire barriers are continuous through concealed spaces (e.g., above a ceiling) to the floor deck or roof deck above the barrier. Fire partitions are not required to extend through concealed spaces if the construction assembly forming the bottom of the concealed space, such as the ceiling, has a fire resistance rating at least equal to or greater than the fire partition.
A high challenge fire wall is a wall used to separate transformers, structures, or buildings or a wall subdividing a building with high fire challenge occupancies, having enhanced fire resistance ratings and enhanced appurtenance protection to prevent the spread of fire, and having structural stability.

Portions of structures that are subdivided by fire walls are permitted to be considered separate buildings, in that fire walls have sufficient structural stability to maintain the integrity of the wall in the event of the collapse of the building construction on either side of the wall.

Characteristics
Fire rating - Fire walls are constructed in such a way as to achieve a code-determined fire-resistance rating, thus forming part of a fire compartment's passive fire protection. Germany includes repeated impact force testing upon new fire wall systems. Other codes require impact resistance on a performance basis
Design loads – Fire wall must withstand a minimum , and additional seismic loads.
Substation transformer firewalls are typically free-standing modular walls custom designed and engineered to meet application needs.
Building fire walls typically extend through the roof and terminate at a code-determined height above it. They are usually finished off on the top with flashing (sheet metal cap) for protection against the elements.

Materials

Building and structural fire walls in North America are usually made of concrete, concrete blocks, or reinforced concrete. Older fire walls, built prior to World War II, used brick materials.
Fire barrier walls are typically constructed of drywall or gypsum board partitions with wood or metal framed studs.
Penetrations – Penetrations through fire walls, such as for pipes and cables, must be protected with a listed firestop assembly designed to prevent the spread of fire through wall penetrations. Penetrations (holes) must not defeat the structural integrity of the wall, such that the wall cannot withstand the prescribed fire duration without threat of collapse.
Openings – Other openings in Fire walls, such as doors and windows, must also be fire-rated fire door assemblies and fire window assemblies.

Performance based design
Firewalls are used in varied applications that require specific design and performance specifications. Knowing the potential conditions that may exist during a fire are critical to selecting and installing an effective firewall.

Performance based design takes into account the potential conditions during a fire. Understanding thermal limitations of materials is essential to using the correct material for the application. Laboratory testing is used to simulate fire scenarios and wall loading conditions. The testing results in an assigned listing number for the fire-rated assembly that defines the expected fire resistance duration and wall structural integrity under the tested conditions. Designers may elect to specify a listed fire wall assembly or design a wall system that would require performance testing to certify the expected protections before use of the designed fire-rated wall system.

Firewalls in vehicles

Firewalls are also regularly found in aircraft and in specially prepared cars for compartmentalisation and competition use. For example, a typical conversion of a production car for rallying will include a metal firewall which seals the fuel tank off from the interior of the vehicle. In the event of an accident, resulting in fuel spillage, the firewall can prevent burning fuel from entering the passenger compartment, where it could cause serious injury or death. In regular stock cars, the firewall separates the engine compartment from the cabin and can, at times, contain fibreglass insulation. Automotive firewalls have to be fitted so that they form a complete seal. Usually this is done by bonding the sheet metal to the bodywork using fibreglass resin.

The term firewall is also commonly used in American English to refer to the barrier between the passenger and engine compartments of a vehicle. The inner and outer surfaces of the firewall are often coated with noise, vibration, and harshness (NVH) absorber to prevent most engine noise from reaching the passenger compartment. In British English, the term for this barrier is bulkhead.

High-voltage transformer fire barriers

Fire barriers are used around large electrical transformers as firewalls. 
These barriers are used to isolate one transformer in case of fire or explosions, preventing fire propagation to neighboring transformers.

See also
Firebreak (forestry)
Fireproofing
Firestop (construction)
Listing and approval use and compliance
High-voltage transformer fire barriers

Notes

External links

FAA Regulation about firewalls in aircraft

Firefighting
Passive fire protection
Types of wall